Li Na (born 9 March 1981 in Dandong, Liaoning) is a Chinese épée fencer. She won a bronze medal in the women's team épée event at the 2000 Summer Olympics, and won gold in the same event at the 2012 Summer Olympics.

Li won the gold medal in the épée team event at the 2006 World Fencing Championships, after beating France in the final. She accomplished this with her teammates Luo Xiaojuan, Zhang Li and Zhong Weiping. Li also reached fourth place in the individual épée event at the 2008 Summer Olympics, losing the play-off for third place 15–11 to Ildikó Mincza-Nébald of Hungary. At the 2012 Summer Olympics, Li won gold in the women's team épée event with Xu Anqi, Luo Xiaojuan and Sun Yujie.

References

1981 births
Living people
Fencers at the 2000 Summer Olympics
Fencers at the 2004 Summer Olympics
Fencers at the 2008 Summer Olympics
Fencers at the 2012 Summer Olympics
Olympic gold medalists for China
Olympic bronze medalists for China
Olympic fencers of China
Sportspeople from Dandong
Olympic medalists in fencing
Chinese female fencers
Fencers from Liaoning
Medalists at the 2000 Summer Olympics
Medalists at the 2012 Summer Olympics
Asian Games medalists in fencing
Fencers at the 2002 Asian Games
Fencers at the 2006 Asian Games
Asian Games gold medalists for China
Asian Games silver medalists for China
Asian Games bronze medalists for China
Medalists at the 2002 Asian Games
Medalists at the 2006 Asian Games
Universiade medalists in fencing
Manchu sportspeople
Universiade bronze medalists for China
Medalists at the 2001 Summer Universiade
Medalists at the 2003 Summer Universiade
Medalists at the 2005 Summer Universiade